Pilet may refer to:

Surname 

 Gérard Pilet (1933-2011), French tennis player
 Hippolyte-Jules Pilet de La Mesnardière (1610-1663), French physician, poet and playwright
 Jacques Pilet (born 1943), journalist and creator of Swiss newspapers
 Louis-Marie Pilet (1815-1877), French cellist
 Marcel Pilet-Golaz, Swiss politician
 Paul-Émile Pilet, (1927-2005), Swiss biologist
 Patrick Pilet (born 1981), French racing driver

Place names 
 Rivière du Pilet, a tributary of Chigoubiche River, in Lac-Ashuapmushuan, Saguenay–Lac-Saint-Jean, Quebec, Canada

See also 
 Pillet

French-language surnames